The men's 200 metres was an event at the 1972 Summer Olympics in Munich. The competition was held on 3–4 September. There were 57 competitors from 42 nations. The maximum number of athletes per nation had been set at 3 since the 1930 Olympic Congress. The event was won by Valeriy Borzov of the Soviet Union, the nation's first medal in the event. Larry Black took silver, extending the United States' podium streak in the men's 200 metres to nine Games. Italy earned its first medal in the event since 1960 with Pietro Mennea's bronze.

Background

This was the 16th appearance of the event, which was not held at the first Olympics in 1896 but has been on the program ever since. One of the eight finalists from the 1968 Games returned: fourth-place finisher (and 1964 bronze medalist) Edwin Roberts of Trinidad and Tobago. Larry Black was the top American and one of the favorites, along with 1971 Pan American Games winner Don Quarrie of Jamaica. European champion Valeriy Borzov of the Soviet Union was also a contender.

Chad, the Republic of the Congo, East Germany, Lesotho, Malawi, Saudi Arabia, and Suriname each made their debut in the event. The United States made its 16th appearance, the only nation to have competed at each edition of the men's 200 metres to date.

Competition format

The competition used the four round format introduced in 1920: heats, quarterfinals, semifinals, and a final. The "fastest loser" system introduced in 1960 was used again in the heats and, for the first time, in the quarterfinals.

There were 9 heats of between 7 and 8 runners each (before withdrawals), with the top 4 men in each advancing to the quarterfinals along with the next 4 fastest overall. The quarterfinals consisted of 5 heats of 8 athletes each; the 3 fastest men in each heat as well as the next fastest runner overall advanced to the semifinals. There were 2 semifinals, each with 8 runners. Again, the top 4 athletes advanced. The final had 8 runners. The races were run on a 400 metre track.

Records

Prior to the competition, the existing world and Olympic records were as follows.

No new world or Olympic records were set during the competition.

Schedule

All times are Central European Time (UTC+1)

Results

Heats

The top four runners in each of the nine heats and the next fastest four advanced to the quarterfinal round.

Heat 1

Heat 2

Heat 3

Heat 4

Wind assisted.

Heat 5

Heat 6

Heat 7

Heat 8

Heat 9

Quarterfinals

The top three runners (blue) in each of the five heats and the next fastest (green) advanced to the semifinal round.

Quarterfinal 1

Quarterfinal 2

Quarterfinal 3

Quarterfinal 4

Quarterfinal 5

Semifinals

Top four in each heat advance to final.

Semifinal 1

Quarrie pulled his hamstring during the race and could not finish.

Semifinal 2

Final

References

External links
Official report

Men's 200 metres
200 metres at the Olympics
Men's events at the 1972 Summer Olympics